Andrew J Turberfield is a British Professor of Physics based at the University of Oxford. Turberfield's research is largely based on DNA nanostructures and photonic crystals, and his work on both nanomachines and photonic crystals has been highly cited. Turberfield is a fellow of Magdalen College, Oxford.

In 2011 he won the Institute of Physics David Tabor Medal and Prize.

References

External links
Turberfield DNA group at the University of Oxford

Living people
British physicists
DNA nanotechnology people
British nanotechnologists
Year of birth missing (living people)
Fellows of Magdalen College, Oxford